The Alfa Romeo Stelvio (Type 949) is a high-performance compact luxury crossover SUV manufactured and marketed by the Alfa Romeo subdivision of Stellantis (formerly with FCA), first revealed at the 2016 Los Angeles Auto Show, and entering production at the Cassino Plant at the end of 2016. It is currently Alfa Romeo's best-selling model, with roughly 43,000 sold in 2018.

The Stelvio uses FCA's Giorgio platform, shared with the D-segment Giulia saloon. The name Stelvio derives from the Stelvio Pass, Italy's highest mountain pass, noted for its 48 circuitous switchbacks.

History and development

Preceded by Alfa Romeo's first off-roader, the Matta, in the 1950s and the Kamal concept car in March 2003, the Stelvio is Alfa Romeo's first production SUV, using a modified version of the Giorgio platform, shared with the Giulia, and available in both rear and all-wheel drive configurations.

The high-performance trim of the Stelvio, the Quadrifoglio, was unveiled on 16 November 2016 at the Los Angeles Auto Show. The European versions of the Stelvio were presented at the Geneva Motor Show in March 2017. The car's engine lineup is similar to that of the Giulia's, with a turbocharged 2.0 litre inline-four and a 2.2 litre diesel inline-four.

On January 18, 2017, Alfa Romeo began accepting orders for the Stelvio First Edition in the EMEA region. On November 2, 2017, the Stelvio Quadrifoglio went on sale in Italy.

For the 2019 model year, diesel engines of the Stelvio were updated to meet the Euro 6d emissions standards, with AdBlue technology introduced to tackle particulates in the exhaust. In addition, Alfa Romeo introduced a new trim level for Europe: the Ti (Turismo Internazionale). Slightly different than the similarly named Stelvio Ti on sale in the United States, the Euro-spec Ti is fitted with the TBI-M 2.0-litre inline-four, mated to an eight-speed automatic transmission, with power sent to all four wheels through Alfa Romeo's Q4 all-wheel drive system.

All models feature an 8.8-inch infotainment system with Apple Car Play and Android Auto as standard, while small tweaks have been made throughout the ranges. In Europe, consumption standards use the WLTP measuring system, which increases accuracy for consumption and emission figures.

Chassis, mechanics and suspensions 

The Stelvio has also the same engines and most of the mechanics, including a carbon fiber driveshaft.

It has a 50/50 weight distribution and a drag coefficient of 0.32 (Cd). To help keep the Stelvio's weight in check, Alfa Romeo uses aluminium for body parts, such as the fenders, hood, and tailgate, as well as for mechanical parts such as the suspension, brakes, and engine.

The suspension, called AlfaLink, implements double wishbones in the front, and an aluminium multi-link configuration in the rear. The springs are longer than those in the Giulia, but stiffer to account for the extra weight and ride height. The driver sits  higher from the road than in the Giulia.

Rear-wheel drive as standard, the Stelvio can be optioned with an Alfa Romeo "Q4" all-wheel drive system, which can send up to 50% of power to the front in low-grip conditions. The Stelvio weighs  with all fluids,  less than an equivalent BMW X3 and  less than a four-cylinder Porsche Macan.

Models

As of 2022 in North America, the Stelvio has four distinct models. Starting with the base model Sprint, the Ti, the Veloce and the top-of-the-line Quadrifoglio. In light of the Alfa Romeo Tonale's release, Stelvio's range of models was condensed from seven to four. At the 2018 Geneva Motor Show, a limited edition (only 108 examples) NRING trim of the Stelvio (Nürburgring-inspired special edition) was unveiled.

Quadrifoglio NRING Edition 
The NRING edition has carbon-ceramic brakes, Sparco seats, carbon-fiber interior trim, and a Mopar-branded gear shifter and floor mats. The cars are differentiated on the exterior by NRING badges as well as carbon-fiber mirror caps and side skirts. Equipment is upgraded to include adaptive cruise control, and a premium sound system.

Nero Edizione 
In April 2018, NYIAS unveiled a Nero Edizione Package for the Stelvio. This edition grants a new exterior appearance through special blacked-out wheels, badging, and other touches. The Nero Edizione package is available only for the 280 horsepower, 2.0-litre model.

Quadrifoglio Racing Edition 
At the 2019 Geneva International Motor Show, Alfa Romeo Racing limited edition was introduced, which celebrates Alfa Romeo's legendary racing history and the entry of a new Italian driver onto the Formula 1 scene: Antonio Giovinazzi joins the "Alfa Romeo Racing" team with World Champion Kimi Räikkönen. This special edition has exclusive paintwork, as a tribute to the Alfa Romeo Racing C38 Formula 1 car.

The retuned engine now produces .

Safety

The Stelvio was crash tested in July 2017 by Euro NCAP. Overall, Stelvio achieved five-star results. For adult protection, the Stelvio did "exceptionally well", with its near-perfect 97% matching that of the Volvo XC90 (all tests are not comparable because Euro NCAP updated its protocols in 2017).

The Stelvio is also fitted with an autonomous emergency braking system (AEB) as standard.

Facelift (2020) 
Alfa Romeo introduced the newly updated Stelvio in China, with both the Giulia and the Stelvio featuring updated interiors, a new 8.8-inch touchscreen for the infotainment system, which now offers a WiFi hotspot, over-the-air software upgrades, integrated emergency call function, and call assistant function.

There is the new leather-wrapped multi-function steering wheel and gear lever, with revised dashboard materials. The debut for North America was in the 2019 LA Auto Show.

Engines and performance
On 29 September 2017, the Alfa Romeo Stelvio Quadrifoglio claimed the title of "World’s Fastest Production SUV", with a Nürburgring lap time of 7 minutes, 51.7 seconds.

North American engines and performance

Sales

Awards
Awards from automotive industry groups and media publishers included:
2018 'Crossover of the Year' By Popular Mechanics.
Car and Driver 2018 Editors’ Choice
SUV of the Year 2018’ for Auto Zeitung 
Performance SUV of the Year by AVA
CUV of Texas by Texas Auto Writers Association 
ArabWheels Award 2018
2019 Readers' Choice Awards by the Auto motor und sport 
2019 What Car? "Performance SUV of the Year 2019" 
2019 Auto Bild Magazine win of the category of "Design", "Best Brands" competition.

References

External links
Official website(U.S.)

Stelvio
All-wheel-drive vehicles
Luxury crossover sport utility vehicles
Compact sport utility vehicles
Crossover sport utility vehicles
Euro NCAP large off-road
Cars introduced in 2016